John Witty (1915–1990) was a British film and television actor.

Witty's distinguished voice appeared extensively on various series and documentary short films. He presented the TV series Mail Call (1955–56) with his wife Genine Graham. He was the TV Announcer for the 1961 film The Frightened City, the Computer Voice for the 1969 Doctor Who serial The Seeds of Death and the Announcer Voice for the 1979 television version of Dick Barton.

Filmography

References

External links

1915 births
1990 deaths
Male actors from Bristol
English male film actors
English male television actors
20th-century English male actors